Dwelly may refer to 

Edward Dwelly (1864–1939), Scottish Gaelic lexicographer
Frederick Dwelly (1881–1957), first Dean of Liverpool